FK Vojvodina is a professional football club based in Novi Sad, Vojvodina, Serbia.

Managers

Notes

References

External links
 

 
Vojvodina